Suburban Birds is a 2018 Chinese drama film by Qiu Sheng.

Plot 
The film tells two separate but related stories. Both are set in Hangzhou, and both center on a character named Xia Hao, but whether these are the same character is left ambiguous. The first is about a group of engineers who survey the elevation in a suburb, and the second is about a group of child friends and ends in the disappearance of most of the children. While investigating the collapse of an apartment building, the older Xia Hao meets and later begins a relationship with a woman named Swallow. Following a dream by one engineer, a water leak in a tunnel is investigated as a possible cause of subsidence. The group of children look for birds and discuss who they like, after which Fang Tin and Foxy compete for the younger Xia Hao's attention. After Fatty stops attending school, the children search for him, leading many of them to disappear.

Cast 

 Mason Lee as Xia Hao
 Gong Zihan as Xia Hao
 Huang Lu as Swallow
 Qian Xuanyi as Foxy
 Xu Shuo as Fang Tin
 Chen Zhihao as Coal
 Chen Yihao as Fatty
 Xu Chenghui as Old Timer
 Xiao Xiao as Han
 Deng Jing as Ant
 Wang Xinyu as Officer Jiang

Production 
Suburban Birds was written and directed by Qiu Sheng, produced by Patrick Mao Huang, Chen Jingsu, and Zhang Zhaowei, and co-produced by Wuyi, Liu Xiang, and Han Tian, with director of photography Xu Ranjun, art direction by Yu Ziyang, music by Xiaohe, and cinematography by Xu Ranjun.

The production companies for Suburban Birds are A Beijing Transcend Pictures Entertainment, Quasar Films, Cforce Pictures, Beijing Yoshow Films, Three Monkeys Films, Shanghai, Beijing Chase Pictures, Kiframe Studio, and Chan Pictures. It is distributed internationally by Flash Forward Entertainment and Luxbox, and in North America by Cinema Guild.

Development 
Qiu has states that the film was a representation of Hangzhou's rapid development leading it to become unrecognizable, along with the central theme of memory and how land and physical space become reflections of memory. The film was influenced by the collapse of Xinjian Primary School in the 2008 Sichuan earthquake.

The film is in Mandarin and the Hangzhou dialect.

Release 
Suburban Birds was approved by the Chinese government and shown at Locarno Film Festival in April 2018. However, a new law came into effect soon after the film's release which required filmmakers to get a certificate to be able to show their films abroad, delaying its American premiere until April 6, 2019.

Reception 
Suburban Birds has received generally positive reviews, holding a rating of 83% on Rotten Tomatoes and a score of 72 on Metacritic. Critics largely described the film as defying easy understanding, visually striking, with compelling storytelling. Some criticism of the film characterized it as unclear or overly self-conscious.

References 

2018 films
2018 drama films
Chinese drama films